Safiabad (also Romanized as Şafīābād; also known as Şūfīābād) is a village in Safaiyeh Rural District, in the Central District of Zaveh County, Razavi Khorasan Province, Iran. At the 2006 census, its population was 4,305, in 986 families.

References 

Populated places in Zaveh County